Elena Murgoci-Florea (20 May 1960 – 26 August 1999) was a female long-distance runner from Romania, who specialized in the marathon race.

Murgoci represented her native country at the 1992 Summer Olympics, finishing in 32nd place in the women's marathon race. She is best known for winning the Amsterdam Marathon (1988) and the Rotterdam Marathon (1989). In 1996, she was disqualified for life by Romanian Athletics Federation for doping. She died aged 39 in Bucharest as a result of being stabbed outside her home by a jealous boyfriend.

Achievements

References

External Links

1960 births
1999 deaths
Romanian female marathon runners
Athletes (track and field) at the 1992 Summer Olympics
Olympic athletes of Romania
Romanian murder victims
People murdered in Romania
Deaths by stabbing in Romania
Violence against women in Romania
Romanian sportspeople in doping cases
Doping cases in athletics